Nuclear Politics in America is a 1997 book by Robert J. Duffy. According to Duffy, the "promise and peril of nuclear power have been a preoccupation of the modern age", who was then an assistant professor of political science at Rider University.

The book discusses the controversy over radioactive waste disposal, licensing procedures relating to the Atomic Energy Act, and the effects of deregulation of electric utilities.  By analysing policy frameworks and describing the process by which regulatory change occurs, Nuclear Politics in America offers a perspective on policymaking in America.

See also
List of books about nuclear issues
List of nuclear whistleblowers
Nuclear power in the United States

References

External links
Nuclear Politics in America: A History and Theory of Government Regulation

1997 non-fiction books
Books about nuclear issues
Books about politics of the United States
History books about the United States
Nuclear history of the United States